Hydropionea dentata is a moth in the family Crambidae. It was described by Herbert Druce in 1895. It is found in Guatemala.

The forewings are brownish fawn, crossed by two fine waved cream-coloured lines. The first near the base, the second beyond the cell. The hindwings are pale cream with a brown marginal line.

References

Moths described in 1895
Spilomelinae